Marcel Sulliger (born 17 July 1967) is a Swiss former alpine skier who competed in the men's combined at the 1994 Winter Olympics, finishing 17th.

External links
 

1967 births
Living people
Swiss male alpine skiers
Olympic alpine skiers of Switzerland
Alpine skiers at the 1994 Winter Olympics
Place of birth missing (living people)
20th-century Swiss people